Ctenucha cyaniris is a moth of the family Erebidae. It was described by George Hampson in 1898. It is found in Ecuador.

References

cyaniris
Moths described in 1898